Ismail H'Maidat (born 16 June 1995) is a professional footballer who plays as an attacking midfielder for Italian  club Como. Born in the Netherlands, he has represented Morocco at senior international level.

Club career

Brescia
H'Maidat played for various teams in his youth career. In 2014, he joined Brescia. He made his Serie B debut on 30 May 2014 against Trapani. He came in as an 87th-minute substitute for Daniele Corvia in a 0–1 away win.

Roma
On 31 January 2016, H'Maidat moved to Serie A club Roma for €3.15 million fee (€150,000 cash plus Ndoj and Somma). on a four-and-a-half-year contract. He joined Ascoli on a temporary deal immediately.

In August 2016 H'Maidat was signed by Serie B club Vicenza. He left the club in January 2017. He was loaned to Portuguese club Olhanense, which was coached by an Italian Cristiano Bacci.

On 7 July 2017, H'Maidat was loaned to Belgian club Westerlo. In January 2018 he was fired by Westerlo for sportsperson unworthy behavior off the field.

Como
On 25 July 2019, after a trial period, H'Maidat was signed by Serie C club Como allowing him to return to active football.

On 31 January 2022, H'Maidat was loaned to Südtirol.

International career
H'Maidat made his first appearance for the senior Morocco national team in a 4–0 friendly win over Canada in October 2016.

Personal life
On 13 March 2018, it was announced that he was arrested for five armed robberies in Belgium. Initially he was found guilty, but H'Maidat successfully appealed the decision and was totally absolved in May 2019, letting him free to comeback to football activities after having spent ten months in jail.

References

External links
 
 

1995 births
Living people
Footballers from Enschede
Association football midfielders
Moroccan footballers
Morocco international footballers
Dutch footballers
Moroccan expatriate footballers
FC Twente players
KFC Turnhout players
Oud-Heverlee Leuven players
Crystal Palace F.C. players
K.R.C. Genk players
R.S.C. Anderlecht players
Brescia Calcio players
A.S. Roma players
Ascoli Calcio 1898 F.C. players
L.R. Vicenza players
S.C. Olhanense players
K.V.C. Westerlo players
Como 1907 players
F.C. Südtirol players
Serie B players
Serie C players
Expatriate footballers in Italy
Dutch sportspeople of Moroccan descent
Challenger Pro League players
Dutch expatriate sportspeople in Belgium
Dutch expatriate sportspeople in Italy
Moroccan expatriate sportspeople in Belgium
Moroccan expatriate sportspeople in Italy
Moroccan expatriate sportspeople in England
Dutch expatriate sportspeople in England
Dutch expatriate footballers
Expatriate footballers in Belgium
Expatriate footballers in England
Expatriate footballers in Portugal
Moroccan expatriate sportspeople in Portugal
Dutch expatriate sportspeople in Portugal